Hope High School is a secondary alternative school located in Port Lavaca, Texas, in the Calhoun County Independent School District. The school serves all of CCISD, including the city of Port Lavaca and Calhoun County. In 2015, the school was rated "Met Alternative Standard" by the Texas Education Agency.

Hope High School is an alternative school and does not have school team sports; however, it does offer physical education, also known as PE.

References

External links
Official Website

Schools in Calhoun County, Texas
Public high schools in Texas
Alternative schools in the United States